Falur Jóhann Harðarson (born 15 October 1968) is an Icelandic basketball coach and a former player. He last coached of Fjölnir men's team.

Playing career

Club career
Falur spent most of his career with Úrvalsdeild club Keflavík. He also played one and a half season with Reykjavík powerhouse KR and split the 1999-2000 season with Korisliiga clubs Torpan Pojat and Espoon Honka. He retired after the 2003–2004 season after being plagued by knee injuries.

National team career
From 1989 to 2000, Falur played 106 games for the Icelandic national basketball team.

Personal life
Falur is married to former Icelandic women's national team player, Margrét Sturlaugsdóttir. They have four daughters Lovísa Falsdóttir, Elfa Falsdóttir, Urður Falsdóttir and Jana Falsdóttir.

Coaching career
Falur was hired as the head coach of Fjölnir men's team in 2017 and helped the team gain promotion to the Úrvalsdeild karla in 2019. He resigned following its relegation back to 1. deild karla in 2020.

Awards and honours

As player

Club
5x Icelandic League champion (1989, 1997, 1999, 2003, 2004)
3× Icelandic Basketball Cup (1997, 2003, 2004)
2x Icelandic Supercup (1997, 2003)

Individual
5x Úrvalsdeild Domestic All-First Team (1991, 1995, 1997–1999)
Úrvalsdeild Domestic Player of the Year (1999)
Úrvalsdeild Young Player of the Year (1987)

As coach
Icelandic Men's League champion (2004)
Icelandic Women's League champion (1990)
Icelandic Men's Basketball Cup (2004)
Icelandic Women's Basketball Cup (1990)
Icelandic Men's Supercup (2003)

References

External links
Úrvalsdeild stats
Korisliiga stats
FIBA Europe profile
1991-1992 college stats
1992-1993 college stats

1968 births
Living people
Charleston Southern Buccaneers men's basketball players
Falur Hardarson
Falur Hardarson
Falur Hardarson
Falur Hardarson
Falur Hardarson
Torpan Pojat players
Falur Hardarsons
Falur Hardarson
Falur Hardarson
Falur Hardarson
Falur Hardarson
Falur Hardarson
Point guards